Johnny Key may refer to:
 Johnny Key (footballer)
 Johnny Key (sprinter)

See also
 Johnny Keyes (disambiguation)
 John Key (disambiguation)